Teenage Zombies: Invasion of the Alien Brain Thingys! is a video game for the Nintendo DS developed by Canadian studio InLight Entertainment.

Gameplay
Teenage Zombies is a platforming game, that also includes several minigames. In the platforming sections, players need to swap between the three characters, each with their abilities, in order to progress through the levels.

Minigames are opened up through the adventure, and use all the Nintendo DS's unique features, such as the microphone and the touchscreen.

Reception

The game received "average" reviews according to the review aggregation website Metacritic.

References

External links
 

2008 video games
Nintendo DS games
Nintendo DS-only games
Platform games
Science fiction video games
Video games developed in Canada
Video games about zombies
Video games featuring female protagonists
Single-player video games
UTV Ignition Games games